Madala Kunene  (born 3 April 1951) is a South African musician born in Kwa-Mashu, near Durban. Kunene started busking on Durban’s beach-front at the age of 7, making his first guitar out of a cooking oil tin and fish gut for the strings, soon becoming a popular performer in the townships.

Early years 
Kunene's music interest was triggered at an early age. He started busking in Durban's beach front at the age of 7 with a self made cooking oil tin guitar. His music is influenced by his upbringing and the history of apartheid system which saw him being a victim of forced removal as a young person.

Kunene was discovered by Sipho Gumede and brought him to Johannesburg where he shared the stage with world renowned musicians such as Hugh Masekela,  Winston Mankunku Ngozi and Busi Mhlongo.

References

South African jazz guitarists
South African musicians
1951 births
Living people